The 2015 Coupe de la Ligue Final was the 21st final of France's football league cup competition, the Coupe de la Ligue, a competition for the 42 teams that the Ligue de Football Professionnel (LFP) manages. The final took place on 11 April 2015 at the Stade de France in Saint-Denis and was contested by reigning champions Paris Saint-Germain, and Bastia, the two teams who also contested the tournament's first ever final in 1995.

PSG won 4–0, with two goals in the first half by Zlatan Ibrahimović and a further two in the second by Edinson Cavani. As winners, they would have qualified for the third qualifying round of the 2015–16 UEFA Europa League, but qualified for the season's UEFA Champions League by winning Ligue 1 instead.

Background
Paris Saint-Germain were the reigning champions, having won a record fourth title in the previous year's final with a 2–1 win over Lyon. It was PSG's sixth final — a joint record with Bordeaux — and they had previously won four (1995, 1998, 2008, 2014) and lost one (2000).

Bastia's only previous Coupe de la Ligue Final was the inaugural edition in 1995. There, they lost 0–2 to PSG.

Route to the final

Bastia
Bastia, as a Ligue 1 club not competing in Europe, entered the tournament in the third round with a home match against Ligue 2 AJ Auxerre at the Stade Armand Cesari on 28 October. They trailed at half time due to Yannis Mbombo's goal for the visitors, but eventually won 3–1 after an equaliser by Floyd Ayité and a brace from Djibril Cissé.

In the last 16, Bastia won 3–2 at home against top-flight Caen. Sloan Privat opened the scoring for the visitors, with Guillaume Gillet equalising before half time. In the second half José Saez put Caen back into the lead, and substitute Famoussa Koné equalised again for Bastia with a minute left. They advanced due to an extra-time goal from another substitute, Benjamin Mokulu.

Bastia were again the hosts in their quarter-final, a 3–1 win over Rennes. They conceded an early goal by Sylvain Armand, with Sebastian Squillaci equalising two minutes into the second half. Rennes captain Romain Danzé then scored an own goal to give Bastia the lead, and Cissé extended their advantage in added time. The Corsican club travelled for the first time in their semi-final on 5 February, to Monaco, where the game finished goalless after extra time at the Stade Louis II. In the penalty shootout, João Moutinho missed a chance to win the shootout after Giovanni Sio had his attempt saved by Maarten Stekelenburg. It went to sudden death, in which Nabil Dirar missed and Squillaci scored to put Bastia into the final.

Paris Saint-Germain
Paris Saint-Germain, due to competing in the UEFA Champions League, entered the tournament in the last 16 away to Ligue 2 club Ajaccio at the Stade François Coty. They were a goal down at half time, after Serge Aurier fouled Mouaad Madri for a penalty which Johan Cavalli converted past Nicolas Douchez. After the break, Edinson Cavani equalised, Aurier put PSG into the lead and Jean Christophe Bahebeck scored the final goal of a 3–1 win.

On 13 January 2015, away again in the quarter-finals, PSG defeated Ligue 1 club Saint-Étienne by a single goal from Zlatan Ibrahimović. The home team's fans did not believe that the ball had crossed the line, and threw objects onto the pitch, disrupting play for 10 minutes. PSG won away by a single goal again in the semi-final on 4 February, a strike from full-back Maxwell to defeat Lille.

Match

References

External links
 

Cup
2015
Paris Saint-Germain F.C. matches
SC Bastia matches
April 2015 sports events in France
Sport in Saint-Denis, Seine-Saint-Denis
Football competitions in Paris
2015 in Paris